The Indigenous Spiritual Ministry of Mishamikoweesh is a diocese of the Anglican Church of Canada. It was created on 1 June 2014 from the northern portion of the Diocese of Keewatin, and includes more than 25 First Nations communities in north-western Ontario and northern Manitoba.

Lydia Mamakwa, who had previously served as suffragan bishop in the Diocese of Keewatin with responsibility for Northern Ontario, was installed as the first Bishop of Mishamikoweesh on 4 June 2014 in Kingfisher Lake, Ontario.

References

External links 
 Indigenous Spiritual Ministry of Mishamikoweesh.

Christian organizations established in 2014
Mishamikoweesh, Indigenous Spiritual Ministry of
2014 establishments in Canada
Anglican Province of Rupert's Land
First Nations in Ontario
First Nations in Manitoba